This list of fish in the River Trent is a list of fish species that have been recorded from the River Trent, a major river in England that starts in Staffordshire, flows through the Midlands, and joins the River Ouse to form the Humber Estuary.

The impressive diversity of fish species in this river has been known (and celebrated) since 1590, with poetry containing the earliest mention that the Trent contains 30 kinds of fish. The earliest actual list of fish in the river is from 1641. Over the centuries some species have since become locally extinct, and other species have been introduced.

Earliest literary references
In 1590, Edmund Spenser in The Faerie Queene described the River Trent and its fish fauna as follows:

This couplet was closely echoed in 1612, in Drayton's Poly-Olbion description of the Trent:

These poems have been a source of curiosity to a number of fishing experts, who have endeavoured to guess the identity of the thirty fish alluded to in the poems.

1641 list
The earliest known list of fish from the River Trent was from 1641. Although the list contains thirty names, one of them is not a fish by modern standards, but an edible crustacean, the Crayfish. The list also includes some fish names that no longer exist in modern English, such as "Frenches" and "Lenbrood"; these species are therefore currently unidentifiable.

The 1641 list of 30 species (verbatim, note antique spelling of some names):

Barbet, Bream, Bullhead, Burbolts, Carp, Chevin, Crayfish, Dates, Eel, Flounder, Frenches, Gudgeon, Grayling, Lampern, Lamphrey, Lenbrood, Loach, Minnows, Pickeral, Pinks, Perch, Roach, Ruff, Salmon, Shad, Smelt, Sticklebats, Sturgeon, Trout, Whitling.

Note on the sturgeon
The largest of these fish was the sturgeon,  a species which at one time was fairly frequently caught in the Trent, but only in low numbers. Notable examples included a sturgeon of eight feet taken near Donington castle in 1255, and another at nearby King's Mill of seven feet in 1791. The last known catch was in 1902 near Holme, Nottinghamshire; the fish was eight and a half feet long and weighed 250 pounds.

1676 description
In 1676 in Izaak Walton described the River Trent as "One of the finest rivers in the world and the most abounding with excellent salmon and all sorts of delicate fish."

Walton also speculated (incorrectly) that the name of the River Trent might be based on the number of fish species, that the Trent is "... so called from thirty kind of fishes that are found in it, or for that it receiveth thirty lesser rivers".

1751 list
In 1751, Charles Deering provided a list of 34 kinds, under the title An alphabetical list of all the fish catch’d in the River Trent. This listed read (verbatim);

Barbel, Bream, Bulhead, Burbot, Carp, Chub, Crayfish, Dace, Eel, Flounder, Grayling, Gudgeon, Lamprey, Lampern, Loach, Minnow, Muscle, Perch, Pike, Roach, Rud, Ruff, Salmon, Salmon Trout, Salmon Pink, Sand Eel, Shad, Smelt, Strickleback, Sturgeon, Stream Pink, Tench, Trout, and Whitling.

This list also includes several unrecognizable fish. It also lists three different names for salmon, as well as "Whitling", which is a name for a young male trout, and "Muscle", which is probably a reference to freshwater mussels, formerly used as food in some areas.

1829
Glover reproduced Deering's list in his History and Gazetteer of the County of Derby, and also provided further information on many of the then known species in the companion volume, The History of the County of Derby (Volume 1).

1985
In 1985, a study of anglers' catches stated that the ‘Trent supports about 40 species’, but they were not listed. The fish that were caught most often, and were important to anglers, included barbel, bream, bleak, carp, chub, dace, eel, gudgeon, perch, and roach.

2007 non-native species
Non-native species that had a sustainable population in the river were listed in 2007, and included the European bitterling (Rhodeus amarus), carp (Cyprinus carpio), and zander (Sander lucioperca).

Master list
This list is based on Deering's 1829 list. It includes the locally extinct species as well as the more recent additions, but it does not claim to be fully comprehensive; other species may occur in the river but are as yet undocumented.

See also
List of fishes of Great Britain
Angling records in the UK

References

Fish Trent
River Trent
Fish Trent
Fish Trent
Fish Trent
Fish Trent
Fish